Rafael Bernabe Riefkohl (born 1959) is a Puerto Rican historian, sociologist, professor and politician. He is currently an elected member of the Puerto Rico Senate representing the Citizen’s Victory Movement.  He was the candidate for governor for the Working People's Party of Puerto Rico in 2012 and 2016. He has socialist beliefs and ideals, and is heavily critical of the New Progressive Party and Popular Democratic Party.

Personal life
Bernabe was born in 1959, in the municipality of Santurce, Puerto Rico. He grew up in Río Piedras.

References

1959 births
Living people
Colegio San Ignacio de Loyola alumni
Members of the Senate of Puerto Rico
People from Santurce, Puerto Rico
21st-century Puerto Rican politicians
Puerto Rican atheists
Movimiento Victoria Ciudadana politicians